is a former Japanese football player.

Club statistics

References

External links

1981 births
Living people
Toyo University alumni
Association football people from Chiba Prefecture
Japanese footballers
J2 League players
Japan Football League players
Omiya Ardija players
Mito HollyHock players
Hokkaido Consadole Sapporo players
Fagiano Okayama players
FC Ryukyu players
Association football midfielders